Saint Nicholas Church is an Eastern Orthodox church on the left bank of the Southern Bug river in Vinnytsia, Ukraine.

According to the historical documents, six Orthodox churches were open in Vinnytsia before 1552. Presumably, Saint Nicholas church was founded by ktetor Anton Postelnik and constructed in the place of a more ancient one. Legends has it that Kyiv-Pechersk monks fleeing from the Mongols were the builders. The church was designed in a typical Ukrainian style as three log cabins with blunt angles. The construction has no nails. At that time churches were still defense objects, that is why its bell tower was moved aside to the stone gray wall and in case of siege could be used as a fortress.

References

18th-century Eastern Orthodox church buildings
Church buildings with domes
18th-century churches in Ukraine